Ivy Margaret Copeland (15 June 1888 – 28 August 1961) was a New Zealand artist and arts teacher.

Born in Auckland on 15 June 1888, Copeland began studying with C. F. Goldie when she was 10 years old, and later studied with the English artist Dennis Seaward in Whanganui. She went on to study at the Elam School of Fine Arts, in Auckland.

In 1933 she moved to the South Island and taught art, first at Canterbury College, and then at Dunedin Training College. After retiring from teaching in 1940, she returned to Auckland and painted full time. In November 1951 she exhibited 96 works at the Auckland Society of Arts (ASA).

Copeland painted traditional subject matter, taking a particular interest in still life, particularly the study of flowers. Copeland also painted landscapes and in 1946 was awarded the Bledisloe Medal for her oil painting Back of Beyond. Copeland is best remembered for her portrait paintings, she had a particular interest in Māori subjects.

In 1940 her landscape painting Winter sunshine, Heathcote, Christchurch was included in the National Centennial Exhibition of New Zealand Art. Two of her works were included in the ASA exhibition New Zealand Women Painters 1845–1968. Most recently she was featured in the 1993 exhibition White Camelias.

Copeland died in Auckland on 28 August 1961. In her will she left her paintings to the ASA to raise funds to establish the Ivy Copeland award for portraiture, awarded to a tertiary student biannually.

References

1888 births
1961 deaths
People from Auckland
New Zealand art teachers
Elam Art School alumni
20th-century New Zealand women artists
20th-century New Zealand painters